The 1900 Northwestern Purple team represented Northwestern University during the 1900 Western Conference football season. In their second year under head coach Charles M. Hollister, the Purple compiled a 7–2–3 record (2–1–2 against Western Conference opponents) and finished in fifth place in the Western Conference.

Schedule

References

Northwestern
Northwestern Wildcats football seasons
Northwestern Purple football